All's Fair at the Fair is a seven-minute cartoon released in 1938. A Color Classic produced by Max Fleischer, it was distributed by Paramount as a promotion for the 1939 New York World's Fair.

Reception
The Film Daily called the short a "novelty cartoon" and gave the following review:

"A couple of sticks visit the fair grounds where the World's Fair is being held, and find themselves participating in a series of adventures with the ultra-modern mechanism operated by robots. Finally, they reach the dance pavilion, and the wife and husband each are taken in hand by robots and whirled around the floor. Other mechanical gags give them a marvelous meal, beauty and barber treatments, and clinical attention to restore their youth. Very clever and novel. A Max Fleischer cartoon in Technicolor."

References

External links
 

1938 short films
American comedy short films
1930s English-language films
Paramount Pictures short films
1930s animated short films
Color Classics cartoons
Fleischer Studios short films
1930s American animated films
1938 animated films
Short films directed by Dave Fleischer
American buddy films
Animated buddy films
1930s buddy films
American animated short films
World's fairs in fiction